Winterland Ballroom (more commonly known as Winterland Arena or simply Winterland) was an ice skating rink and music venue in San Francisco, California. The arena was located at the corner of Post Street and Steiner Street. It was converted for exclusive use as a music venue in 1971 by concert promoter Bill Graham and became a common performance site for many famous rock artists. Graham later formed a merchandising company called Winterland Productions which sold concert shirts, memorabilia, and official sports team merchandise.

Origins
The venue was opened on June 29, 1928, as the New Dreamland Auditorium. It served as an ice skating rink that could be converted into a seated entertainment venue.  Sometime in the late 1930s the building's name was changed to Winterland, and it successfully operated through the Great Depression. It was built in 1928 for $1 million (equivalent to $ million in ). The New Dreamland was built on the site of the Dreamland Rink (midway on the west side of Steiner between Post and Sutter) and Sid Grauman's National Theatre (on the corner of Post and Steiner).

In 1936, Winterland began hosting the Shipstads and Johnson Ice Follies. Impresario Clifford C. Fischer staged an authorized production of the Folies Bergère, the Folies Bergère of 1944, at the Winterland Ballroom in November 1944. The Ballroom hosted opera, boxing and tennis matches.

As a music venue
Starting on September 23, 1966, with a double bill of Jefferson Airplane and the Paul Butterfield Blues Band, Bill Graham began to rent the venue occasionally for larger concerts that his nearby Fillmore Auditorium could not properly accommodate. After closing the Fillmore West in 1971, he began to hold regular weekend shows at Winterland.

Various popular rock acts played there, including such bands and musicians as Bruce Springsteen, The Rolling Stones, The J. Geils Band, The Who, Black Sabbath, James Gang, Mahogany Rush, Quicksilver Messenger Service, UFO, REO Speedwagon, Queen, Slade, Boston, Cream, Yes, Fleetwood Mac, Kiss, The Doors, Jimi Hendrix, Steppenwolf, Lynyrd Skynyrd, Styx, Van Morrison, The Allman Brothers Band, Grateful Dead, The Band, Big Brother and the Holding Company (with Janis Joplin), Jethro Tull, Pink Floyd, Ten Years After, Rush, Electric Light Orchestra, David Bowie, Genesis, Santana, Jefferson Airplane, Sons of Champlin, Sex Pistols, Traffic, Golden Earring, Grand Funk Railroad, Humble Pie, Bob Seger and the Silver Bullet Band, Robin Trower, Emerson, Lake & Palmer, Sha Na Na, Loggins and Messina, Lee Michaels, Heart, Journey, Deep Purple, J.J. Cale, Spirit, The Chambers Brothers, Alice Cooper, Frank Zappa and the Mothers of Invention, Foghat, Mountain, B.B. King, Montrose, George Thorogood and the Delaware Destroyers and Elvis Costello. Led Zeppelin first performed their song "Whole Lotta Love" there.

The Tubes headlined New Year's Eve 1975 with Flo and Eddie.

Many of the best-known rock acts from the 1960s and 1970s played at Winterland or played two blocks away across Geary Boulevard at the original Fillmore Auditorium. Peter Frampton recorded parts of the fourth-best-selling live album ever, Frampton Comes Alive!, at Winterland. The Grateful Dead made Winterland their home base, and The Band played their last show there on Thanksgiving Day 1976. That concert, featuring numerous guest performers including Neil Young, Eric Clapton, Bob Dylan, Joni Mitchell, and many others, was filmed by Martin Scorsese and released in theaters and as a soundtrack under the name The Last Waltz. Winterland also hosted the Sex Pistols' final show, on January 14, 1978.

Final concerts
During Winterland's final month of existence, shows were booked nearly every night. Acts included The Tubes, Ramones, Smokey Robinson, Tom Petty and the Heartbreakers, and on December 15–16, 1978, Bruce Springsteen & the E Street Band. Springsteen's December 15 show was simulcast on local radio station KSAN-FM.

Winterland closed on New Year's Eve 1978 / New Year's Day 1979 with a concert by the Grateful Dead, New Riders of the Purple Sage, and The Blues Brothers. The show lasted for over eight hours, with the Grateful Dead's performance—documented on DVD and CD as The Closing of Winterland—lasting nearly six hours, beginning at midnight with Bill Graham's favorite Dead tune, Sugar Magnolia. After the show, the crowd was treated to a hot, buffet-style breakfast. The final show was simulcast on radio station KSAN-FM and also broadcast live on the local PBS TV station KQED.

Winterland was eventually razed in 1985 and replaced by apartments.

Live recordings at Winterland
A number of films and recordings were made in whole or in part at the Winterland Arena.

Concert films
The Band – The Last Waltz
Grateful Dead – The Grateful Dead Movie, The Closing of Winterland
Sha Na Na – Live at Winterland (1974) (bootleg)
Kiss – Kissology Volume One: 1974–1977
Sex Pistols – The Filth and the Fury

Live albums
Avengers - Live at Winterland 1978
The Allman Brothers Band – Wipe the Windows, Check the Oil, Dollar Gas
Big Brother and the Holding Company (lead singer Janis Joplin) – Live at Winterland '68
The Blues Brothers – Live - The Closing of Winterland, 31st December 1978
Cream – Wheels of Fire (erroneously listed as being recorded at the Fillmore on the original LP), Live Cream, Live Cream Volume II, Those Were the Days
Electric Light Orchestra – Live at Winterland '76
Peter Frampton – Frampton Comes Alive!
Grateful Dead – Steal Your Face, Dick's Picks Volume 10, So Many Roads (1965–1995), The Closing of Winterland, The Grateful Dead Movie Soundtrack, Winterland: 1973: The Complete Recordings, Road Trips Volume 1 Number 4, Winterland June 1977: The Complete Recordings, Dave's Picks Volume 13
Jimi Hendrix – Live at Winterland, The Jimi Hendrix Concerts (live tracks of various gigs), and Winterland (4-CD box set)
The Doors – Boot Yer Butt: The Doors Bootlegs
Jefferson Airplane – Thirty Seconds Over Winterland
Loggins and Messina - On Stage
Sammy Hagar – All Night Long
Bruce Springsteen – Live/1975–85. Both December 1978 concerts were released in full as part of his archive series on December 20, 2019.
The Band – The Last Waltz
Humble Pie – Live at Winterland
Paul Butterfield's Better Days – Live at Winterland Ballroom (1973)
Sha Na Na – The Golden Age of Rock 'n' Roll
Sutherland Brothers & Quiver – Winterland

Further reading 

 
 

</ref>

References

External links

 
 
 
 
 

Entertainment venues in San Francisco
Demolished buildings and structures in San Francisco
Ballrooms in the United States
Demolished music venues in the United States
Demolished sports venues in California
Demolished theatres in California
Demolished buildings and structures in California
Former music venues in California
Music venues in San Francisco
Western Addition, San Francisco
Defunct indoor arenas in California
Buildings and structures completed in 1928
Buildings and structures demolished in 1985
1925 establishments in California
1985 disestablishments in California
Culture of San Francisco